Blood of My Blood is a 2015 Italian drama film directed by Marco Bellocchio. It was screened in the main competition section of the 72nd Venice International Film Festival and in the Masters section of the 2015 Toronto International Film Festival.

Cast
 Roberto Herlitzka as the count
 Pier Giorgio Bellocchio as Federico
 Lidiya Liberman as Benedetta 
 Alba Rohrwacher as Maria Perletti
 Federica Fracassi as Marta Perletti
 Fausto Russo Alesi as Cacciapuoti
 Alberto Cracco as the Franciscan Inquisitor
 Sebastiano Filocamo as the Father confessor
 Bruno Cariello as Angelo
 Filippo Timi as the madman
 Toni Bertorelli as Dr Cavanna
 Ivan Franek as Rikalkov
 Patrizia Bettini as the count's wife
 Elena Bellocchio as Elena
 Alberto Bellocchio as Cardinal Federico Mai

Reception

Box office

Blood of My Blood grossed $424,494 at the box office.

Awards

References

External links
 

2015 films
2015 drama films
2010s Italian-language films
Italian drama films
Films directed by Marco Bellocchio
2010s Italian films